Cirilo de Alameda y Brea O.F.M. Obs.  (9 July 1781, in Torrejón de Velasco, Spain – 30 June 1872, in Toledo) was a cardinal of the Catholic Church. He was archbishop of Toledo 1857–1867.

Life 
He had worked as a priest in Uruguay and in Brazil. He was minister general of his order from 1817 until 1823.

In 1831, he was elected archbishop of Santiago de Cuba. He was consecrated a bishop by cardinal Francisco Javier de Cienfuegos y Jovellanos. In the same year, he was counselor of Spain. In 1849, he was appointed archbishop of Burgos. He was appointed archbishop of Toledo eight years later.
He was made cardinal in 1858 by Pope Pius IX and died 1872 at the age of 90 years. At the time of his death, he was the oldest living cardinal.

See also 
Catholic Church in Spain

References

External links and additional sources
 (for Chronology of Bishops)  
 (for Chronology of Bishops) 
  

3

1781 births
1872 deaths
People from the Community of Madrid
19th-century Spanish cardinals
Cardinals created by Pope Pius IX
Archbishops of Toledo
Carlists
19th-century Roman Catholic archbishops in Spain
Observant Franciscan bishops
Franciscan cardinals
Roman Catholic archbishops of Santiago de Cuba